Irvin Warrican (27 November 1965 – 21 August 2022) was a Vincentian cricketer. He played in six first-class and four List A matches for the Windward Islands from 1990 to 1996.

Warrican died on 21 August 2022, at the age of 56.

See also
 List of Windward Islands first-class cricketers

References

External links
 

1965 births
2022 deaths
Saint Vincent and the Grenadines cricketers
Windward Islands cricketers